Tarni Brown (born 26 March 2002) is a professional Australian rules footballer playing for the Collingwood Football Club in the AFL Women's (AFLW). Daughter of 1994–1998 former Collingwood captain, Gavin Brown, she played for the Eastern Ranges in the NAB League Girls before she was drafted to Collingwood in 2020 under the father–daughter rule.

Early life and state football
Brown started her sporting career playing basketball. She played for Nunawading Spectres in the Melbourne United Victorian Junior Basketball League (MUVJBL) Under 18 Girls competition, making 19 appearances.

Brown started playing football only at the age of 14, starting out with her local club Donvale. The next year, she joined Eastern Ranges in the NAB League Girls and played for them for three seasons. In the 2019 season, playing as a tough midfielder, she averaged five tackles per game over 10 games for Eastern Ranges and was then selected for the 2020 AFL Women's (AFLW) academy, a nine month program involving camps and training with the AFLW clubs. For the 2020 season, she was also included in Eastern Ranges' leadership group.

AFLW career
Brown was drafted to Collingwood with the 19th pick of the 2020 AFL Women's draft, which was Collingwood's first pick, under the father–daughter rule. She received the number 26 guernsey, like her father. Brown played in her first official hit-out in the first practice match of the season, playing against North Melbourne at Ikon Park. Less than two weeks later, she made her debut in the first match of the 2021 AFL Women's season against Carlton at Ikon Park. In round 6 of the season, Brown received a nomination for the 2021 AFL Women's Rising Star award, after collecting 15 disposals, taking four marks, and scoring a goal against the Western Bulldogs. It was revealed Brown had signed on with Collingwood for two years on 10 June 2021.

Personal life
Brown is the daughter of former Collingwood captain, Gavin Brown, and the younger sister of Callum Brown and Tyler Brown, who both played for Collingwood's AFL team.

Statistics
Statistics are correct to the end of the S7 (2022) season.

|- 
! scope="row" style="text-align:center" | 2021
|style="text-align:center;"|
| 26 || 11 || 4 || 1 || 48 || 76 || 124 || 20 || 33 || 0.4 || 0.1 || 4.4 || 6.9 || 11.3 || 1.8 || 3.0
|- 
! scope="row" style="text-align:center" | 2022
|style="text-align:center;"|
| 26 || 8 || 1 || 0 || 29 || 43 || 72 || 13 || 22 || 0.1 || 0.0 || 3.6 || 5.4 || 9.0 || 1.6 || 2.0
|- 
! scope="row" style="text-align:center" | S7 (2022)
|style="text-align:center;"|
| 26 || 10 || 3 || 3 || 46 || 67 || 113 || 22 || 32 || 0.3 || 0.3 || 4.6 || 6.7 || 11.3 || 2.2 || 3.2
|- class="sortbottom"
! colspan=3| Career
! 29
! 8
! 4
! 123
! 186
! 309
! 55
! 87
! 0.3
! 0.1
! 4.2
! 6.4
! 10.7
! 1.9
! 3.0
|}

References

External links
 
 
 

2002 births
Living people
Eastern Ranges players (NAB League Girls)
Collingwood Football Club (AFLW) players
Australian rules footballers from Victoria (Australia)
Sportswomen from Victoria (Australia)